The Alliance Commercial Historic District, located roughly along Box Butte Ave. in Alliance, Nebraska is a historic district that was listed on the National Register of Historic Places in 2007.

The city of Alliance was founded in 1888 with the arrival of a railroad.  Its commercial district, which includes some '"high style"' buildings including an Art Deco theatre and a neo-classical style post office, are included in the district along with other late 1800s and early 1900s buildings.  Its oldest buildings date from 1893.  Its NRHP nomination asserted that the district was mostly intact and "is able to evoke a sense of historic time and place."

References

External links 

Romanesque Revival architecture in Nebraska
Mission Revival architecture in Nebraska
Buildings and structures completed in 1893
Geography of Box Butte County, Nebraska
Historic districts on the National Register of Historic Places in Nebraska
National Register of Historic Places in Box Butte County, Nebraska